Arckaringa Station is a pastoral lease in the Australian state of South Australia which that once operated as a sheep station but now operates as a cattle station.

Most of the property is composed of gibber plains, flood-out creek systems and breakaway country. The ephemeral Arckaringa Creek runs through the property. The property and the Creek are both named after the rocky outcrop, Mount Arckaringa in the Painted Desert. The name is Aboriginal in origin but the meaning is not known.

A government bore had been sunk on the upper Arckaringa Creek in 1883 for the purposes of watering stock along a stock route than ran through the area from the Musgrave Ranges.

The property was having a reasonable season 1912 when it occupied an area of  within a dry season. The government were planning to sink a bore near the centre of the run as the owner, Mr. F. C. Staer, had lost nearly 400 sheep. The property was owned in 1913 by Mr. F. C. Steer who was still running sheep.

In 1925 Arckaringa was owned by Alexander McLeod, and had experienced heavy rains. In 1935 the area was inundated by heavy rains with Arckaringa receiving  in one day.

In 2000 a new endangered plant species was discovered on the station, Olearia arckaringensis, a form of Daisy-bush with approximately 200 found during a survey. The property was struck by drought in 2004.

The land occupying the extent of the Arckaringa Station pastoral lease was gazetted as a locality in April 2013 under the name 'Arckaringa'.

See also
List of ranches and stations

References

Stations (Australian agriculture)
Pastoral leases in South Australia
Far North (South Australia)